James Patrick Hanley (October 13, 1885 – May 1, 1961) was a Major League Baseball pitcher. In one career game, he had a 0-0 record, with a 6.75 ERA. His career ended abruptly when a line drive struck him in the head, leaving him partially blind. He batted right-handed and threw left-handed.

Hanley was born in Providence, Rhode Island, and died in Elmhurst, New York.

External links

1885 births
1961 deaths
New York Yankees players
Major League Baseball pitchers
Manhattan Jaspers baseball players
Baseball players from Providence, Rhode Island